Louis Chauvot (born 14 February 1913, date of death unknown) was a French sailor. He competed in the 5.5 Metre event at the 1960 Summer Olympics.

References

External links
 

1913 births
Year of death missing
French male sailors (sport)
Olympic sailors of France
Sailors at the 1960 Summer Olympics – 5.5 Metre
People from Montceau-les-Mines
Sportspeople from Saône-et-Loire
20th-century French people